QIP is a three-letter abbreviation with multiple meanings, as described below:

 Quality Intellectual Property Metric (QIP metric), a standard of Silicon intellectual property cores, developed by Virtual Socket Interface Alliance for Integrated circuit design in the field of Semiconductor
 Quality Improvement Plan, a document outlining methods to improve outcomes, for example in patient care at a hospital.
 Quality Improvement Paradigm, a framework for continuous quality improvement proposed by Victor Basili in 1984
 Quantum information processing
 Quantum Innovation Platform, a method for rapid innovation, research, and problem solving
 QIP (complexity), a complexity class in computational complexity theory
 Quad in-line package, an electronic chip housing standard
 Quiet Internet Pager, a third-party closed-source freeware multiprotocol IM client
 Qualified institutional placement, a method of raising equity by a listed company
 QIP., an Amsterdam based fashion brand specialized in pique menswear